Zayn al-Abidin Shirvani (1779—1837), also known by his pen-name of Tamkin, was a Persian scholar, mystic, and traveler from Shirvan.

Biography 
A native of the Shirvan region, Shirvani belonged to a Shia Muslim family. The region was then ruled by the Shirvan Khanate, a dependency of Zand Iran. At the age of five, Shirvani went to the city of Karbala along with his father Mulla Iskandar, where he studied for twelve years. It was there that Shirvani met the Ni'matullahi masters Ma'sum Ali Shah Dakani and Nur-Ali Shah Isfahani. When Shirvani returned to Iran in 1814, he attempted to find a home in several places, ultimately settling in city of Shiraz. He later died in 1837 during a pilgrimage to the city of Mecca.

Amongst the disciples of Shirvani was Reza-Qoli Khan Hedayat (died 1871), a literary historian, administrator, and poet.

Shirvani is notable for writing about the concept of Iran. Writing in 1813, he says that "from time immemorial" the lands of Iran reached from the Euphrates to the Jayhun (Amu Darya), and from Darband to the coast of Oman. Although Shirvani was not a nationalist, he showed his attachment to the ahl-i Furs (people of Persia), claiming that they were "a magnificent clan" who in "terms of intellect and aptitude are free of want from the people of the inhabited quarter of the world."

References

Sources

Further reading 
 
 

1779 births
1837 deaths
18th-century Iranian philosophers
19th-century Iranian philosophers
19th-century Persian-language writers
Iranian geographers
People of Qajar Iran